"Breaking Point" is a single by Welsh heavy metal band Bullet for My Valentine. It is the fourth and final single from their fourth studio album Temper Temper. A music video for the song was released on 7 June 2013, and an official single release came out on 12 August 2013. "Breaking Point" peaked at number 36 on Mainstream Rock Songs

Personnel
 Matthew Tuck - lead vocals, rhythm guitar
 Michael "Padge" Paget – lead guitar, backing vocals
 Michael "Moose" Thomas – drums, percussion
 Jason James – bass guitar, backing vocals

References

External links
 Music Video

2013 singles
Bullet for My Valentine songs
2012 songs
RCA Records singles
Songs written by Matthew Tuck
Songs written by Michael Paget
Songs written by Jason James (musician)
Songs written by Don Gilmore (record producer)